Sam Hill Memorial may refer to:
Sam Hill Memorial Bridge, carrying US 97 over the Columbia River between Oregon and Washington, U.S.
Sam Hill Memorial Rock, at Chanticleer Point, Oregon, U.S.
Samuel Hill Memorial Park, now Peace Arch State Park in Washington, U.S.